Ahmed Kattawi (born  8 April 1991) is an Egyptian footballer who currently plays for Tala'ea El-Gaish. He is a product of Zamalek SC youth academy. Kattawi's debut was in the season (2010–2011), he moved to Tala'ea El-Gaish in 2013.

References

Egyptian footballers
Zamalek SC players
1991 births
Living people
Association football midfielders
Egyptian Premier League players